The 1915 Grand National was the 77th renewal of the Grand National horse race that took place at Aintree near Liverpool, England, on 26 March 1915. Lady Nelson became the first female owner to win the Grand National.

Finishing Order

Non-finishers

References

 1915
Grand National
Grand National
20th century in Lancashire
March 1915 sports events